Laser Physics Letters is a monthly peer-reviewed scientific journal that publishes short, rapid communications in fundamental optics and laser physics, and the application of lasers across interrelated sciences. It is owned and editorially managed by Astro Ltd and published on their behalf by IOP Publishing. The journal was established in 2004 with Pavel P. Pashinin as the founder editor-in-chief. Current editor-in-chief is Vanderlei S. Bagnato. It is a sister journal to Laser Physics.

Abstracting and indexing
The journal is abstracted and indexed in:
Science Citation Index Expanded
Current Contents
Scopus
INSPEC

See also
Laser

References

External links
 

Optics journals
IOP Publishing academic journals
Laser science
Monthly journals
Publications established in 1990
English-language journals